Laidley Run is a  long 2nd order tributary to Middle Wheeling Creek in Ohio County, West Virginia.  This is the only stream of this name in the United States.

Variant names 
According to the Geographic Names Information System, it has also been known historically as:
 Ladley Run
 Lailly Run

Course 
Laidley Run rises about 2.5 miles northeast of Beham, Pennsylvania, and then flows westerly into West Virginia to join Middle Wheeling Creek about 5 miles north-northwest of Dallas.

Watershed 
Laidley Run drains  of area, receives about 41.2 in/year of precipitation, has a wetness index of 292.31, and is about 58% forested.

See also 
 List of rivers of Pennsylvania
 List of rivers of West Virginia

References 

Rivers of Washington County, Pennsylvania
Rivers of Ohio County, West Virginia
Rivers of Pennsylvania
Rivers of West Virginia